Lars Johannes Irgens (9 October 1775 – 22 April 1830) was a Norwegian jurist and public official. He served as a representative at the Norwegian Constitutional Assembly.

Lars Johannes Irgens was born in Hof in Solør, Hedmark, Norway. He was the son of the parish priest of Hof.
He was married to Christiane Louise Smith (1778-1858) with whom he had eight children including Norwegian government minister Nils Christian Irgens.

He served as a lieutenant in Oppland Dragon Corps (Oplandske Dragonregiment). He graduated as cand.jur. in 1802, and was appointed district stipendiary magistrate (sorenskriver) at Sogn in Sogn og Fjordane the same year. He held this office until his death .
He represented Nordre Bergenhus amt (now Sogn og Fjordane) at the Norwegian Constituent Assembly at Eidsvoll in 1814 together with Peder Hjermann and Niels Nielsen. All three representatives supported the independence party (Selvstendighetspartiet).

References

External links
Lars Johannes Irgens,  Eidsvollsmennene
Representantene på Eidsvoll 1814 (Cappelen Damm AS)
 Men of Eidsvoll (eidsvollsmenn)

Related Reading
 Holme Jørn (2014) De kom fra alle kanter - Eidsvollsmennene og deres hus  (Oslo: Cappelen Damm) 

1775 births
1830 deaths
Fathers of the Constitution of Norway
Members of the Storting
Sogn og Fjordane politicians
Norwegian jurists
19th-century Norwegian people